Samet Akaydin (born 13 March 1994) is a Turkish professional footballer who plays as a defender for  Süper Lig side Fenerbahçe.

Career
Akaydın began his youth career with Black Sea Region based clubs Trabzon İdmanocağı, Trabzonspor, Boluspor and started his professional career with hometown club Arsinspor, played four seasons with İstanbul based club Sancaktepe, one season with Şanlıurfaspor, one and half seasons with Ankara Keçiörengücü. Then he moved to Süper Lig side Adana Demirspor where he had successful seasons and selected to the national team. On 12 January 2023, he signed Turkish powerhouse Fenerbahçe SK for three and half years.

Career statistics

International career
Akaydin debuted with the Turkey national football team in a friendly 2–1 win over the Czech Republic on 19 November 2022.

Honours

Club
Adana Demirspor
TFF 1. Lig: 2020–21
Sancaktepe
TFF 2. Lig: 2016–17

Individual
Süper Lig Right Center Back of the Year: 2021–22

References

External links
 
 

Living people
1994 births
Turkish footballers
Sportspeople from Trabzon
Association football defenders
Boluspor footballers
Arsinspor footballers
Şanlıurfaspor footballers
Ankara Keçiörengücü S.K. footballers
Adana Demirspor footballers
Fenerbahçe S.K. footballers
Süper Lig players
TFF First League players
TFF Second League players
TFF Third League players